Annapurna Pictures is an American independent media company founded by Megan Ellison on April 2, 2011 and based in Los Angeles, California. It is active in film, television and theatrical production, film distribution and video game publishing.

History
Annapurna Pictures was founded in 2011 by Megan Ellison as a production and finance entity focusing on high-end auteur-driven cinema.

After attending University of Southern California’s film school for two semesters, Ellison left in 2005 and traveled the world. Among her stops was Nepal, where she trekked on the Himalayan mountain Annapurna, for which her production company is named.

By 2014 Annapurna had produced and/or financed the films Lawless, The Master, Killing Them Softly, Zero Dark Thirty, Spring Breakers, The Grandmaster, Her, Foxcatcher, and American Hustle, and was starting production on Joy, Sausage Party, Wiener-Dog, 20th Century Women, and Everybody Wants Some!!.

In December 2016, the company announced its new division, Annapurna Interactive, to produce, develop, and distribute video games with several active projects in development, planned for release in 2017.

In January 2017, the company announced they would begin distributing films, with their first being Detroit directed by Kathryn Bigelow, set for release on August 4, 2017. They later signed a multi-year distribution deal with Metro-Goldwyn-Mayer on March 27, in which MGM will distribute all of Annapurna's films in select international territories. On April 6, the company also announced an exclusive, multi-year output licensing agreement with Hulu.

In May 2017, Plan B Entertainment and Annapurna announced a three-year production deal to partner on at least three films a year, with Annapurna handling distribution and marketing. As part of the deal, Annapurna received the rights to Adam McKay's film Vice starring Christian Bale as Dick Cheney. It was also announced Annapurna would co-distribute Brad's Status through their MGM joint venture Mirror alongside Amazon Studios. In July, the company signed a multi-year U.S. home entertainment pact with 20th Century Fox Home Entertainment to oversee its home releases.

Since Sony Pictures' contract to co-produce the James Bond series with MGM and Eon Productions expired with the release of Spectre, Annapurna, along with five major studios – Warner Bros., Universal Pictures, 20th Century Fox, Paramount Pictures and Sony itself – vied to win the rights to the next film as of April 2017. It was then announced that MGM had secured the domestic, digital and worldwide television rights to the film. Universal was announced as the international distributor of the film and holder of the rights for physical home entertainment distribution.

In October 2017, Annapurna and MGM announced the formation of a U.S. distribution joint venture in which each studio would release their films individually. This marked a return to domestic theatrical distribution for MGM and an expansion of Annapurna's distribution division, with MGM releasing approximately six to eight films per year on a limited basis and Annapurna releasing four to six films per year, in a combined slate of fourteen films. While the two companies are sharing costs for the joint venture's operations, Annapurna's distribution and marketing teams supported the MGM titles, which were distributed under the MGM banner while Annapurna-produced films continued to be distributed under its own banner. The two studios also launched Mirror, a releasing entity that pursues theatrical opportunities for additional third-party films. However, this partnership is not exclusive to all MGM films, as several of them continued to be released through existing studio partners, such as Warner Bros. and Paramount. The newly relaunched Orion Pictures and future worldwide distributor plans for the James Bond franchise, are also not included, which MGM announced on "a later date", May 24, 2018, to have been won by Universal Pictures.

In October 2018, Annapurna signed a music publishing deal with Warner/Chappell Music, which administered the studio's film and TV compositions and scores.

In February 2019, Annapurna and MGM rebranded and expanded their U.S. distribution joint venture to release both MGM and Annapurna films under United Artists Releasing, with the distribution teams of Annapurna and Orion Pictures (whose films are added as well) joining the venture and former Screen Gems executive Pam Kunath joining as COO in addition to the heads of MGM and Annapurna joining the board of directors. The decision was made to coincide with the United Artists brand's 100th anniversary, and has plans to release 10–14 films a year through the new label, including the domestic release of No Time to Die (which marks a reunion between the UA brand and the James Bond franchise after two decades).

In December 2022, Annapurna launched its animation division with former Blue Sky Studios executives Robert Baird and Andrew Millstein leading the new studio. Nimona is set as its first release.

On March 4, 2023, it was revealed that Amazon had shut down UAR's operations and folded it into MGM. It's unknown if this effects Annapurna's partnership with MGM.

Filmography

As production company
{| class="wikitable"
|- style="background:#ccc; text-align:center;"
! Year !! Film title !! Notes
|-
| rowspan="4"| 2011 || Passion Play  || distributed by Image Entertainment
|-
| Waking Madison || distributed by Entertainment One
|-
| Main Street || distributed by Magnolia Pictures
|-
| Catch .44 || distributed by Anchor Bay Films
|-
| rowspan="4"| 2012 || Lawless  || co-production with The Weinstein Company
|-
| The Master ||  co-production with The Weinstein Company  Nominated - Critics' Choice Movie Award for Best Picture  Nominated - Gotham Independent Film Award for Best Feature
|-
| Killing Them Softly || co-production with Plan B Entertainment; distributed by The Weinstein Company
|-
| Zero Dark Thirty || co-production with Columbia Pictures  National Board of Review Award for Best Film  National Board of Review: Top Ten Films  Nominated - AACTA Award for Best International Film  Nominated - Academy Award for Best Picture  Nominated - BAFTA Award for Best Film  Nominated - Critics' Choice Movie Award for Best Picture  Nominated - Golden Globe Award for Best Motion Picture – Drama  Nominated - Producers Guild of America Award for Best Theatrical Motion Picture  Nominated - Satellite Award for Best Film
|-
| rowspan="4"| 2013 ||Spring Breakers || co-production with Muse Productions; distributed by A24  Nominated - Venice Film Festival for Golden Lion
|-
| The Grandmaster || co-production with Block 2 Pictures, Jet Tone Films, Sil-Metropole Organization, and Bona International Film Group; distributed by The Weinstein Company  Hong Kong Film Award for Best Film  Hong Kong Film Critics Society Award for Best Film  Nominated - Golden Horse Award for Best Feature Film
|-
| Her || co-production with Warner Bros. Pictures  National Board of Review Award for Best Film  National Board of Review: Top Ten Films  Saturn Award for Best Fantasy Film  Nominated - Academy Award for Best Picture  Nominated - Critics' Choice Movie Award for Best Picture  Nominated - Golden Globe Award for Best Motion Picture – Musical or Comedy  Nominated - Producers Guild of America Award for Best Theatrical Motion Picture
|-
| American Hustle || co-production with Columbia Pictures and Atlas Entertainment  Golden Globe Award for Best Motion Picture – Musical or Comedy  Screen Actors Guild Award for Outstanding Performance by a Cast in a Motion Picture  Nominated - AACTA Award for Best International Film  Nominated - Academy Award for Best Picture  Nominated - BAFTA Award for Best Film  Nominated - Critics' Choice Movie Award for Best Picture  Nominated - MTV Movie Award for Movie of the Year  Nominated - Producers Guild of America Award for Best Theatrical Motion Picture  Nominated - Satellite Award for Best Motion Picture  Nominated - Teen Choice Award for Choice Movie – Drama
|-
| 2014 || Foxcatcher || co-production with Sony Pictures Classics  Nominated - Cannes Film Festival for Palme d'Or  Nominated - Golden Globe Award for Best Motion Picture – Drama  Nominated - Producers Guild of America Award for Best Theatrical Motion Picture
|-
| rowspan="2" |2015
|Terminator Genisys|co-production with Skydance Media; distributed by Paramount Pictures
|-
| Joy || co-production with 20th Century Fox and Davis Entertainment  Nominated - Critics' Choice Movie Award for Best Comedy  Nominated - Golden Globe Award for Best Motion Picture – Musical or Comedy
|-
| rowspan="4"| 2016 || Everybody Wants Some!! || co-production with Paramount Pictures  Nominated - Gotham Independent Film Award for Best Feature
|-
| Wiener-Dog || co-production with Killer Films; distributed by Amazon Studios and IFC Films
|-
| Sausage Party || co-production with Columbia Pictures, Point Grey Pictures, and Nitrogen Studios
|-
| 20th Century Women || produced by; distributed by A24  Nominated - Critics' Choice Movie Award for Best Acting Ensemble  Nominated - Golden Globe Award for Best Motion Picture – Musical or Comedy
|-
| rowspan="3"| 2017 || The Bad Batch || co-production with VICE Films; distributed by Neon  Venice Film Festival for Special Jury Prize
|-
| Detroit || co-production with First Light Productions and Page 1  NAACP Image Award for Outstanding Independent Motion Picture  Nominated - NAACP Image Award for Outstanding Motion Picture
|-
| Phantom Thread || co-production with Focus Features and Ghoulardi Film Company  National Board of Review: Top Ten Films  Nominated - Academy Award for Best Picture 
|-
| rowspan="4"| 2018 || The Sisters Brothers || co-production with Why Not Productions and Page 114 Productions  Nominated - César Award for Best Film  Nominated - Venice Film Festival for Golden Lion
|-
| If Beale Street Could Talk || co-production with Plan B Entertainment and Pastel Productions  Independent Spirit Award for Best Film  National Board of Review: Top Ten Films  Satellite Award for Best Motion Picture – Drama  Nominated - Black Reel Award for Outstanding Film  Nominated - Critics' Choice Movie Award for Best Picture  Nominated - Golden Globe Award for Best Motion Picture – Drama  Nominated - Gotham Independent Film Award for Best Feature  Nominated - NAACP Image Award for Outstanding Motion Picture 
|-
|The Ballad of Buster Scruggs || uncredited; co-production with Netflix
|-
| Vice || co-production with Plan B Entertainment and Gary Sanchez Productions  Nominated - AACTA Award for Best International Film  Nominated - Academy Award for Best Picture  Nominated - Critics' Choice Movie Award for Best Picture  Nominated - Critics' Choice Movie Award for Best Acting Ensemble  Nominated - Golden Globe Award for Best Motion Picture – Musical or Comedy  Nominated - Producers Guild of America Award for Best Theatrical Motion Picture
|-
| rowspan="6"| 2019 || Missing Link || co-production with Laika  Golden Globe Award for Best Animated Feature Film  Nominated - Academy Award for Best Animated Feature  Nominated - Annie Award for Best Animated Feature  Nominated - Critics' Choice Movie Award for Best Animated Feature  Nominated - Producers Guild of America Award for Best Animated Motion Picture
|-
| Booksmart || co-production with Gloria Sanchez Productions  GLAAD Media Award for Outstanding Film – Wide Release  Independent Spirit Award for Best First Feature
|-
| Where'd You Go, Bernadette || co-production with Color Force
|-
| Hustlers || credit only; produced by Gloria Sanchez Productions, Nuyorican Productions and STX Entertainment  Nominated - Gotham Independent Film Award for Best Feature  Nominated - Satellite Awards for Best Motion Picture – Comedy or Musical
|-
| Wounds || produced by; distributed by Hulu 
|-
| Bombshell || credit only; produced by Bron Studios, Denver and Delilah Productions, Lighthouse Media & Management, Creative Wealth Media; distributed by Lionsgate  Nominated - GLAAD Media Award for Outstanding Film – Wide Release  Nominated - Satellite Awards for Best Motion Picture – Drama
|-
| 2020 || Kajillionaire || co-production with Plan B Entertainment; distributed by Focus Features
|-
| 2022 || She Said|co-production with Plan B Entertainment; distributed by Universal Pictures
|-
| 2023 || Nimona|an Annapurna Animation film; co-production with Vertigo Entertainment and DNEG Animation; distributed by Netflix; first Annapurna Animation film
|-
| rowspan="2"| TBA || Landscape with Invisible Hand || co-production with Plan B Entertainment; distributed by Metro-Goldwyn-Mayer
|-
| Nightbitch || co-production with Searchlight Pictures, Bond Group Management, Archer Grey, and Defiant by Nature; distributed by Hulu
|}

 As distributor 
The company expects to release "approximately four to six films per year".

Reception
Most of the films produced by the company have received widespread critical acclaim. In 2013 alone, Her, American Hustle and The Grandmaster had a combined seventeen Academy Award nominations. Commercially, results have been mixed. Some films like The Master, Foxcatcher, Joy, Detroit and Vice, however, do not return their budget while ones such as Zero Dark Thirty, Sausage Party and American Hustle have grossed more than $100 million, the latter grossing more than $250 million worldwide.

Annapurna Television

Annapurna Television is an television production company of Annapurna Pictures, launched on September 27, 2016, and was formerly headed by HBO executive Sue Naegle (with her label, Naegle Ink, now part of the division). In January 2017, it was reported that Annapurna Television would produce the Coen brothers' first TV project, The Ballad of Buster Scruggs.

Television series

Video games

Annapurna Interactive published its first video game What Remains of Edith Finch on April 25, 2017. What Remains of Edith Finch received "universal acclaim" on PC and "generally positive" reviews on PS4, according to video game review aggregator Metacritic. The publisher has also provided funding and publication support for The Artful Escape by Beethoven & Dinosaur, Ashen by A44 and Gorogoa'' by Jason Roberts. Annapurna Interactive is also responsible for publishing Twelve Minutes, a point-and-click adventure game about a man stuck in a time-loop, released on August 19, 2021.

Theater 
Annapurna Theatre produces plays and live shows on, and off-Broadway.

International distributors

See also
 Point Grey Pictures

References

External links
 

Annapurna Pictures films
Film production companies of the United States
Film distributors of the United States
Companies based in Los Angeles
Mass media companies established in 2011
2011 establishments in California
American companies established in 2011
American independent film studios